The Ministry of Economic Affairs and Finance's functions are:

Manage the Iranian treasury department,
Lending by the government to banks in Iran,
Regulation of Iran's economy and its financial policy,
implementing & enforcing tax policies in Iran,
in charge of foreign direct investment (F.D.I.),
directing the banking and commercial insurance sector of Iran,
regulating the financial markets of Iran, see also: Securities and Exchange Organization (SEO) & Central Bank of Iran.
 
The affairs related policy-making, organizations, and institutes in the field of trade of goods and services are handled by the Ministry of Economic Affairs and Finance (Ministry of E.A.F.).

Ministers of Finance during the Imperial State of Iran
Ministers responsible for finance under Pahlavi dynasty. 

Mohammad Ali Foroughi, 1924-1925
Morteza Gholi Bayat, 1925-?
Vossug ed Dowleh, 1926
Firouz Nosrat-ed-Dowleh III, 1927-1929
Mohammad Ali Farzin, 1929
Hassan Mashhar, 1929-1930
Hassan Taqizadeh, 1930-1933
Ali Akbar Davar, 1933-1937
Mahmud Badr, 1938-1939
Rezagholi Amir Khosravi, 1939-1941
Abbasqoli Golshayan, 1941
Hassan Musharraf Nafisi, 1941-?
Mahmoud Nariman, ?-1943
Morteza-Qoli Bayat, 1943-?
Allah-Yar Saleh, 1943
Bagher Kazemi, 1943-?
Mahmud Badr, ?-1945
Abdolhossein Hazhir, 1945
Morteza-Qoli Bayat, 1945-1946
Abolqasem Najm, 1945-1946
Abdolhossein Hazhir, 1946
Morteza-Qoli Bayat, 1946-?
Abdolhossein Behnia, ?-1948
Abbasqoli Golshayan, 1948-1950
 Abdolhossein Behnia, 1950
Mohammad Ali Varasteh, 1950
Taghi Nasr, 1950-?
Mohammad Ali Varasteh, 1950-1951
Ali Asghar Forouzan, ?-1951
Mohammad Ali Varasteh, 1951-1952
Seyed Baqer Kazemi, 1952-1953
Ali Amini, 1953-1954-?
Ali Asghar Nasser, ?-1955
Mohammad Sajadi, 1955-1957
Taghi Nasr, 1957-?
Qolam Hosein Foruhar, ?-1957-?
Ali Asghar Nasser, ?-1958-?
Ali-Akbar Zargham, 1959-1961
Abdolbaghi Shoai, 1961-1962
Jahangir Amuzegar, 1962
 Abdolhossein Behnia, 1962-1963
Abdolbaghi Shoai, ?-1963
 Abdolhossein Behnia, 1963-1964
Amir-Abbas Hoveida, 1964-1965
Jamshid Amouzegar, 1965-1974
Hushang Ansary, 1974-1977
Mohammad Yeganeh, 1977-1978
Hassan-Ali Mehran, 1978-1979
Rostam Pirasteh, 1979

Ministers of Finance of the Islamic Republic of Iran

The Customs Administration of the Islamic Republic of Iran

The Customs Administration is affiliated to the Ministry of Economic Affairs and Finance. All activities regarding importation, exportation, transit, collection of import duties and other cases such as temporary importation are carried out by the Customs Administration, which is in charge of implementing the Customs Affairs Act of the
Iranian year 1350 (Hijri calendar) (1971 Gregorian calendar), and by-Laws of the Executive Branch of Iran.

Organization for Collection and Sale of State-owned Properties of Iran (OCSSPI)

Affiliated to the Ministry of E.A.F.(Ministry of Economic Affairs and Finance), the purpose of the O.C.S.S.P.I. (Organization for Collection and Sale of State-owned Properties of Iran) is to regulate properties, some of the duties includes the collection, storage, management, and sale of properties that as per the law are under the ownership, possession, custody or management of the government of Iran.

State Tax Organization

Affiliated to the Ministry of E.A.F. (Ministry of Economic Affairs and Finance), the Iranian National Tax Administration is also incharge of collection of taxes from the public and supervises the implementation of tax laws and regulations in Iran. To facilitate the E-commerce, the Executive Branch of Iran is implementing a bar code (similar to ISBN of Books) system (called 'Irancode') across the UN Member State of Iran. It will facilitate e-commerce and tax collection to build a better Iran.

Privatization Organization

According to the Fourth edition of Five-Year Economic Development Plan (2005-2010), the Privatization Organization of Iran, which after discussions with the Ministry of E.A.F (Ministry of Economic Affairs and Finance) sets the prices and manages the shares of government-owned companies for the public. It also puts the stocks on the Tehran Stock Exchange. President of Iranian Privatization Organization is Ali-Ashraf Abdollah Porihoseini.

Organization for Investment Economic and Technical Assistance

Affiliated to the Ministry of E.A.F. (Ministry of Economic Affairs and Finance), the Organization for Investment Economic and Technical Assistance (OIETA) centralizes, regulates and perform activities related to foreign investments in the UN Member State of Iran, Iran's foreign investments abroad, providing loans and credit facilities to foreign firms, institutes or governments as well as obtaining loan or credit from foreign or international sources. OIETA is a "one-stop institution" for foreign direct investment in Iran.

See also
Ministry of Commerce (Iran)
Organization for Collection and Sale of State-owned Properties of Iran (OCSSPI)
Economy of Iran
Cabinet of Iran
Government of Iran
Supreme Audit Court of Iran
General Inspection Office (Iran)
Iran's international rankings in economy

References

External links

Official Website
Iran Audit Organization - Linked to the Ministry of Finance

Finance
Iran
Iran
Finance in Iran